Buntingville is a Methodist mission station 15 km south-east of Mthatha. Originally established by the Reverend W B Boyce in 1830 as Old Bunting near the village of the Pondo chief Faku at the headwaters of the Umngazana River, it was transferred about 1865. Named after Jabez Bunting (1779–1858), the English Wesleyan church leader.

References

Populated places in the Nyandeni Local Municipality
1830 establishments in South Africa
Populated places established in 1830